Blake Anthony Carter (born August 21, 1984), known professionally as Shy Carter, is an American songwriter, record producer, rapper and singer. He has written for Meghan Trainor, Jason Derulo, Charlie Puth, Faith Hill, Tim McGraw, Keith Urban, Kane Brown and Billy Currington. He co-wrote Charlie Puth's double platinum hit "One Call Away" which hit No. 1 on Billboard's Adult Top 40 chart. In 2009, he co-wrote "Someday" with Rob Thomas, which spent over 40 weeks in the Top 5 and became a No. 1 hit on Billboards Adult Top 40 chart. "Stuck Like Glue", his collaboration with Sugarland, debuted on the Billboard Hot 100 at No. 20 and became the 11th most downloaded country music song of all time. He has also been featured on Latin artist Gloria Trevi's #1 song "Habla Blah Blah". He's also worked with Faith Hill, Ashanti, and Chingy. Carter also wrote a song titled "Bring it Back", which was released on August 7, 2015, and reached the Top 40 of Billboard's Rhythmic chart.

Career

Beginnings 
Carter grew up in Memphis, TN. He played saxophone in church and with bands on Beale Street. In 2007, Shy Carter was discovered by talent manager Courtney Benson. Carter signed a production deal with Benson's former client Nelly. A year later, he signed a publishing agreement with Primary Wave Entertainment.

2009–2014 
In September 2009, Rob Thomas released "Someday", co-written with Carter, and became Rob Thomas's third career No. 1 on Billboards Adult Top 40 chart. Within a couple of years, he co-wrote "Stuck Like Glue" with Kevin Griffin (Better Than Ezra), Jennifer Nettles and Kristian Bush of Sugarland. It was released in July 2010, selling almost three million copies and became the 11th most downloaded country music song of all time, and the highest debut for a country group or duo on the Hot 100, debuting at No. 20. He co-wrote, co-produced, and was featured alongside Ray J on Mr. Midwest's song, "Shorty Is A Weirdo", which was released on March 20, 2011. In May 2012, Haley Reinhart released Listen Up! with the song, "Let's Run Away" which he co-wrote and produced. Carter co-wrote and co-produced the song, "Don't Keep in Touch", from Marcus Canty's EP, This...Is Marcus Canty. In 2013, he was a part of two songs on the country artist Billy Currington's album We Are Tonight, on which he co-wrote, produced and sang background on "Hallelujah" as well as rapped a verse on "Banana Pancakes". Carter appeared on Gloria Trevi's album, De Pelicula, singing a rap verse on "Habla Blah Blah". The song reached No. 1 on the Adult Pop Songs on the Billboard charts. He was also on the song "Mr. Almost", from Meghan Trainor's debut, three-time platinum studio album, Title.

2015–present 
Shy released his single "Bring It Back" under RCA Records in 2015. It debuted on Sirius XM Hits 1 radio, on their weekend show, "Hitbound", on July 25, 2015, and "graduated" to their "Weekend Countdown" on September 19, 2015. The song hit the Top 40 of the Billboard Rhythmic charts. Shy wrote Jamie Foxx's single "Baby's In Love" feat. Kid Ink which was released in May 2015. Carter appeared on DJ Quik and Problem's Rosecrans EP on the track "A New Nite". Shy also appeared on Charlie Puth's song "As You Are", from Puth's debut studio album, Nine Track Mind and co-wrote the double platinum hit single "One Call Away". Billy Currington's number one "It Don't Hurt Like It Used To" (released in February 2016) was also co-written by Shy. Shy co-wrote Faith Hill and Tim McGraw's single "Speak to a Girl" off their duets album as well as Tim McGraw's single "Way Down".  Additionally, Carter co-wrote Kane Brown's hit tracks "Heaven" and "Good As You". He is also featured on two songs on Keith Urban's album, Graffiti U, and is credited as a writer on Keith Urban's song, "God Whispered Your Name" (released in February 2020).

Discography

Singles 
 "Good Love" (2020) (written by: Shy Carter, Micah Carter, James Slater, Carlo, Colasacco) (produced by David Garcia)
 "Beer with My Friends" featuring Cole Swindell and David Lee Murphy (2021)

Songwriting credits

References

American male songwriters
1984 births
Living people